Brad Pike is a former Australian professional rugby league player. A prop, he made two appearances for the Sydney City Roosters during the 1995 ARL season.

References

Year of birth missing (living people)
Living people
Australian rugby league players
Rugby league props
Sydney Roosters players